The men's 3000 metres steeplechase at the 2012 African Championships in Athletics was held at the Stade Charles de Gaulle on  29 June.

Medalists

Records

Schedule

Results

Final

References

Results

Steeplechase 3000 Men
Steeplechase at the African Championships in Athletics